Paek Nam-sun ( or  ; March 13, 1929 – January 2, 2007) was the North Korean Minister of Foreign Affairs from 1998 until his death.  He was one of the few North Koreans to frequently be in the international spotlight.

Early life 
Paek was born in Kilju County, North Hamgyong Province.

Education 
Paek graduated from Kim Il-sung University in Pyongyang.

Career 
In 1968, Paek became vice director of the International Affairs Department of the Workers' Party of Korea. Paek participated in the first round of North-South Red Cross talks in 1972.

In 1974, Paek became the ambassador to Poland until 1979.

Paek also served on the Supreme People's Assembly from 1990 until the time of his death, having been elected to the 9th, 10th, and 11th sessions.

Personal life 
His third son Paek Ryong-Chon became the president of the Central Bank of the Democratic People's Republic of Korea in 2011.

Death 
Paek died on 2 January 2007 in Pyongyang.  North Korean state media attributed the death to an undefined illness although it was said that he suffered from kidney disease.  He was the only North Korean foreign minister to have met his American counterpart.

Paek was ill for some time prior to his death and the role was filled by one of his deputies, most notably Kim Kye-gwan.

See also

Politics of North Korea

References and notes

Yonhap News Agency.  "Who's who, North Korea," pp. 787–812 in 
 PAEK, Nam-sun International Who's Who. accessed September 1, 2006.
North Korea's foreign minister dies, Al-Jazeera English, accessed January 3, 2007

External links
BBC death report
NKChosun profile

1929 births
2007 deaths
People from Kilju County
Workers' Party of Korea politicians
Foreign ministers of North Korea
Members of the Supreme People's Assembly
North Korean diplomats
Ambassadors of North Korea to Poland